Elections to Hyndburn Borough Council were held in May 1980. 1980 was the second year of local elections on the new boundaries. One third of the council was up for election and the Conservative party lost overall control of the council. Labour taking 8 seats from the Conservatives.

After the election, the composition of the council was
Conservative (28-8=20)
Labour (19+8=27)

Ward Results

References

1980 English local elections
1980
1980s in Lancashire